Charles Bogardus (March 28, 1841–October 17, 1929) was an American politician, farmer, and businessman.

Bogardus was born in Cayuga County, New York. He went to the public schools and worked at a country store in Cayuga County. He served in the 151st New York Volunteer Infantry during the American Civil War and was commissioned a colonel in the Union Army. He then worked in the mercantile business in Ridgeway, New York. In 1872, Bogardus moved to Paxton, Illinois with his wife and family. He was involved with the real estate business and with farming. Bogardus also helped organized other businesses in Paxton, Illinois. Bogardus served in the Illinois House of Representatives from 1885 to 1889 and was a Republican. He then served in the Illinois Senate from 1889 to 1901. In 1900, Bogardus and his wife settled in Pellston, Michigan where he was involved in the lumbering business; he still had his office in Paxton, Illinois. Bogardus died at his home in Pellston, Michigan from kidney problems.

Notes

External links

1841 births
1929 deaths
People from Cayuga County, New York
People from Emmet County, Michigan
People from Paxton, Illinois
People from Ridgeway, New York
People of New York (state) in the American Civil War
Businesspeople from Illinois
Businesspeople from Michigan
Businesspeople from New York (state)
Farmers from Illinois
Republican Party members of the Illinois House of Representatives
Republican Party Illinois state senators